Fritz J. Scheuren is an American statistician known for his work on human rights, record linkage, and administrative records.  He was president of the American Statistical Association in 2011.

Scheuren is a vice president of the National Opinion Research Center.

Scheuren was a coauthor, with Thomas Herzog and William Winkler, of the 1997 book, Data Quality and Record Linkage Techniques (Springer, 1997).
He co-edited the book Statistical Methods for Human Rights with David L. Banks and Jana Asher.

References

External links
Contact information for Fritz Scheuren at George Washington University

Katherine M. Condon. 2017. Interview with Fritz J. Scheuren: Statistical Mentsch. Statistical Journal of the IAOS 33, 269–285. DOI 10.3233/SJI-171061, 

American statisticians
Presidents of the American Statistical Association
Fellows of the American Statistical Association
Year of birth missing (living people)
Living people